Ni Ko Ye, born Ye Win, was a prominent Burmese writer. He published more than 30 objects and wrote more than 100 film, video, radio script. His career began in 1998.

Biography 
Ye Win born on November 2, 1966 in Yangon, Myanmar. In 1993, he graduated from Yangon University with a degree in botany. After graduating, his first novel, Ma Kyi Pyar and Her Negative Love was released in February 1998. The book was made into a successful film as Sky Blue Negative and Me, starring Lwin Moe and Htun Eindra Bo. He married Ma Naing Naing Win in 1999. Ngar doht Sarpay() republished his first novel, Ma Kyi Pyar and Her Negative Love, a second time in November 2015.

He gained success as a director, script with his original movie, Thit Khat Ngar, starting Dwe and Htet Htet Moe Oo.

He died on October 23, 2009.

References

Burmese writers
University of Yangon alumni
People from Yangon
1966 births
2009 deaths